The 2015 FIM Ice Speedway Gladiators World Championship was the 2015 version of FIM Individual Ice Racing World Championship season. The world champion was determined by ten races hosted in five cities Krasnogorsk, Tolyatti, Almaty, Assen and Inzell between 31 January and 15 March 2015.

Final Series

Classification

See also 
 2015 Team Ice Racing World Championship
 2015 Speedway Grand Prix in classic speedway

References 

Ice speedway competitions
World